PHPEdit was a commercial IDE developed by the French company WaterProof SARL. It ran on the Microsoft Windows operating system, and was designed mainly for the PHP language, but supported many other languages such as CSS, HTML, JavaScript, INI, PHPEditScript, PlainText, SQL, XML, and XSLT.

As of August 2017, both PHPEdit and Waterproof websites are dead; product status is unknown.

Features
 Syntax highlighting for multiple languages in one document. Supported languages are  CSS, HTML, JavaScript, INI, PHPEditScript, PHP, PlainText, SQL, XML, and XSLT
 Code Hint for HTML, SQL and PHP
 Code Insight for HTML, SQL and PHP
 Code beautifier
 Integrated PHP debugger
 Automatic syntax checking
 Help generator
 Task Reporter
 Customizable shortcuts
 More than 150 scriptable commands
 Keyboard templates
 To-do report generator
 QuickMarks
 File Explorer
 FTP Explorer
 EZ Publish integration
 CVS and SVN integration
 Solution Explorer
 Database Explorer
 Code browser
 Visual Query Builder
 Project Manager
 Plugins
 Integrated help manuals
 PHPUnit integration

History
PHPEdit development started as personal project of Sébastien Hordeaux in 1999. Distributed freely over the Internet, the project's community grew to more than 200,000 users. During this period of growth, Sébastien met John Knipper, Bertrand Dunogier and Daniel Lucazeau. In April 2004 they helped him create WaterProof SARL.

In July 2004, the first commercial version of the IDE was sold and since, hundreds of companies have adopted PHPEdit as their main development environment for PHP.

In November 2004, Bastien Hofmann joined the company to speed up PHPEdit development.

In April 2005, Jean Roussel joined the company to reinforce the PHP development department and develop a new solution called wIT, a PHP-based issue tracker.

Version history

References

External links

Integrated development environments
Discontinued development tools
Pascal (programming language) software